Autonomic can refer to:
Autonomic nervous system, a division of the peripheral nervous system that supplies smooth muscle and glands, and thus influences the function of internal organs
Autonomic computing, the self-managing characteristics of distributed computing resources

See also
 Autonomy (disambiguation)